(Dis)Honesty: The Truth About Lies is a 2015 feature-length documentary film directed by Yael Melamede. It explores the reasons why people lie and the methods they use. It features direct testimony, footage and the experimental research carried out by Dan Ariely.

Release
(Dis)Honesty: The Truth About Lies premiered at the 2015 Full Frame Documentary Film Festival.

Critical response
Variety stated about the film: "this entertaining mix of anecdotal evidence, academic research and current affairs is a diverting survey that should hold appeal for niche buyers in various formats". The Hollywood Reporter described (Dis)Honesty: The Truth About Lies as a "deep-think doc animated by the researcher at its center". The New York Times criticized the lack of exploration of the loss of trust in the wider society.

The film has an 89% rating, with an average score of 7.02/10 based on 18 reviews, on Rotten Tomatoes. It has a rating of 60/100 on Metacritic, stating "Mixed or average reviews based on 6 Critics".

See also
The Honest Truth about Dishonesty

References

External links 

2015 films
2015 documentary films
Documentary films about psychology
Lying
2010s English-language films